Amanda Rantanen (born 11 May 1998) is a Finnish footballer who plays as a forward for KIF Örebro in the Swedish Damallsvenskan and the Finland women's national team.

Career
Rantanen made her senior debut for HJK in 2016. In 2018 she moved to PK-35 and helped them to achieve promotion to Kansallinen Liiga in 2019.

Rantanen played her first senior international for Finland women's national team in December 2020 against Scotland scoring a last-minute winner.

International goals

References

External links
 

1998 births
Living people
Finnish women's footballers
Finland women's international footballers
Helsingin Jalkapalloklubi (women) players
PK-35 (women) players
Kansallinen Liiga players
Women's association football forwards
Footballers from Helsinki
UEFA Women's Euro 2022 players
21st-century Finnish women